The River Tove is a river in England, a tributary of the River Great Ouse. Its final  form part of the border between Northamptonshire and Buckinghamshire, running alongside the Grand Union Canal. The river ultimately flows into the North Sea.

Etymology
The Old English name of Towcester, which is named for the River Tove, is Tófe-ceaster, suggesting (since ceaster comes from the Latin castra, meaning "camp") that the Old English name for the Tove was some form of Tófe. Bosworth and Toller give the "Scandinavian proper names" Tófi and Tófa for comparison.

It is thought Tófa is a shortened form of Thorfrithr, meaning "beautiful Thor" or "peace of Thor."

However, the clearest link for an older origin of the Tove name can be found in the dedication on the Sønder Vissing Runestone. The 10th century carvings describe the stone as having been raised by Tófa, in memory of her mother. The first character of her name is ᛏ, the Rune for Týr, a Northern European deity thought to be of early origins in an Indo-European Pantheon. He was a sky god, god of justice, sacrifice and war.

References

Tove
Tove
Tove